Clytie scotorrhiza is a moth of the family Erebidae first described by George Hampson in 1913. It is found in Israel, the Sinai, Egypt and Saudi Arabia.

There is probably one generation per year. Adults are on wing from October to April.

The larvae probably feed on Tamarix species, including Tamarix aphyla.

External links

Image

Ophiusina
Moths described in 1913
Moths of the Middle East